Ethan Jeffrey Arthur Kelley (born February 12, 1980) is a former American football defensive tackle. He was drafted by the New England Patriots in the seventh round of the 2003 NFL Draft. He played college football at Baylor.

High school career
Kelley attended Kempner High School in Sugar Land, Texas. As a senior, he was an All-District selection as both an offensive and defensive lineman, and on defense, posted two sacks, 67 tackles, and two pass deflections.

College career
Kelley played college football at Baylor. He started 21 games on the offensive line as a freshman and sophomore. Midway through spring training in 2001, Kelley was switched to defensive line. During the two seasons that he played defense, Kelley made 133 tackles and four sacks. He majored in business and graduated in May 2003.

Professional career
Kelley was drafted by the New England Patriots in the seventh round (243rd overall) of the 2003 NFL Draft. He was later released and signed to the Patriots practice squad, where he spent the 2003 season. He played in one game during the 2004 season before being waived and signed by the Cleveland Browns. During the 2005 season, he appeared in 11 games. He started two of those games against the Miami Dolphins and the Minnesota Vikings before going on injured reserve. In 2006, he continued as the second string NT behind Ted Washington and also began transitioning to left defensive end, where he played one game.

Kelley was signed to a new one-year contract by the Browns on April 19, 2007. Kelley underwent microfracture surgery on his knee after the 2007 season and is currently a free agent.

References

External links
 Cleveland Browns bio

1980 births
American football defensive tackles
Baylor Bears football players
Cleveland Browns players
Kempner High School alumni
Living people
New England Patriots players
Sportspeople from Amarillo, Texas
Players of American football from Texas